7543 Prylis  is a Jupiter trojan from the Greek camp, approximately  in diameter. It was discovered on 19 September 1973, by Dutch astronomer couple Ingrid and Cornelis van Houten at Leiden, on photographic plates taken by Dutch–American astronomer Tom Gehrels at the Palomar Observatory, California. The dark Jovian asteroid is possibly spherical in shape and has a rotation period of 17.8 hours. It was named after Prylis, son of Hermes from Greek mythology.

Orbit and classification 

Prylis is a dark Jovian asteroid orbiting in the leading Greek camp at Jupiter's  Lagrangian point, 60° ahead of the Gas Giant's orbit in a 1:1 resonance . It is also a non-family asteroid in the Jovian background population. It orbits the Sun at a distance of 4.9–5.5 AU once every 11 years and 10 months (4,320 days; semi-major axis of 5.19 AU). Its orbit has an eccentricity of 0.06 and an inclination of 14° with respect to the ecliptic. The body's observation arc begins with a precovery at Palomar in May 1956, more than 18 years prior to its official discovery observation.

Palomar–Leiden Trojan survey 

While the discovery date aligns with the second Palomar–Leiden Trojan survey, Prylis has not received a  prefixed survey designation, which was assigned to the discoveries made by the fruitful collaboration between the Palomar and Leiden observatories in the 1960s and 1970s. Gehrels used Palomar's Samuel Oschin telescope (also known as the 48-inch Schmidt Telescope), and shipped the photographic plates to Ingrid and Cornelis van Houten at Leiden Observatory where astrometry was carried out. The trio are credited with the discovery of several thousand asteroids.

Naming 

This minor planet was named after Prylis, one of many sons of the Olympian god Hermes. He suggested that entry to Troy could be gained by means of the Trojan Horse, which was eventually built by the carpenter Epeius (also see 2148 Epeios). The subterfuge of the wooden horse was later claimed by Odysseus. The official naming citation was published by the Minor Planet Center on 18 August 1997.

Physical characteristics 

Prylis is an assumed C-type asteroid.

Rotation period 

In June 2016, a first rotational lightcurve of Prylis was obtained from photometric observations by Robert Stephens at the Center for Solar System Studies in Landers, California. Lightcurve analysis gave a rotation period of  hours with a low brightness amplitude of 0.10 magnitude.

Diameter and albedo 

According to the survey carried out by the NEOWISE mission of NASA's Wide-field Infrared Survey Explorer, Prylis measures 42.89 kilometers in diameter and its surface has an albedo of 0.055. The Collaborative Asteroid Lightcurve Link assumes a standard albedo for a carbonaceous asteroid of 0.057 and a diameter of 42.23 kilometers based on an absolute magnitude of 10.6.

Notes

References

External links 
 Asteroid Lightcurve Database (LCDB), query form (info )
 Dictionary of Minor Planet Names, Google books
 Discovery Circumstances: Numbered Minor Planets (5001)-(10000) – Minor Planet Center
 Asteroid 7543 Prylis at the Small Bodies Data Ferret
 
 

007543
Discoveries by Cornelis Johannes van Houten
Discoveries by Ingrid van Houten-Groeneveld
Discoveries by Tom Gehrels
Named minor planets
19730919